The DC Animated Movie Universe (DCAMU) is an American media franchise and shared universe centered on a series of superhero films,  produced by Warner Bros. Animation and DC Entertainment and distributed by Warner Home Video. The films are part of the DC Universe Animated Original Movies line, based on the comic books published by DC Comics, and feature plot elements inspired by The New 52 continuity. The continuity, established by crossing over common plot elements, settings, cast, and characters, was introduced in Justice League: The Flashpoint Paradox, which was released in 2013. Sequels to The Flashpoint Paradox, Son of Batman, and Justice League Dark co-exist with this continuity. The franchise has received positive reviews for its themes and creative direction, and has obtained high sales. As of 2020, sixteen films have been distributed. Justice League Dark: Apokolips War marks the final film of this specific line. DC Showcase short Constantine: The House of Mystery was released in May 2022 which is a narrative sequel to Justice League Dark: Apokolips War.

Development
The franchise is loosely based on a set of New 52 storylines from the DC Universe. Following a teaser in the franchise's first film Justice League: The Flashpoint Paradox, a five-film story arc loosely based on the "Darkseid War" series written by Geoff Johns, started from Justice League: War and was later revisited in The Death of Superman, Reign of the Supermen and concluded in Justice League Dark: Apokolips War, the sequel to 2017's Justice League Dark. The franchise heavily focuses on Batman and his son Damian Wayne, the latter of whom becomes the new Robin in this continuity.

The franchise includes four Batman and Justice League films: Son of Batman in 2014, Batman vs. Robin in 2015, Batman: Bad Blood in 2016, and Batman: Hush in 2019, Justice League: The Flashpoint Paradox, Justice League: War, Justice League: Throne of Atlantis and Justice League vs. Teen Titans. Other films include two Justice League Dark films: Justice League Dark in 2017 and Justice League Dark: Apokolips War in 2020, two Superman films: The Death of Superman and Reign of the Supermen, one Suicide Squad (Suicide Squad: Hell to Pay), one Teen Titans (Teen Titans: The Judas Contract) and one Wonder Woman film (Wonder Woman: Bloodlines).

Films

Short films

Expanded setting

The DCAMU version of the Teen Titans appear in Teen Titans Go! vs. Teen Titans in which the Go! version of the Titans travel throughout the multiverse and run into the DCAMU version.

Timeline

As depicted in the DC Animated Movie Universe

Recurring cast and characters

Other media

Web series 
The CW seed released a five episode animated miniseries titled Constantine: City of Demons written by J. M. DeMatteis in March 2018, sharing continuity with Justice League Dark. Matt Ryan reprises his role as John Constantine. On October 9, the series was re-released as a film as an extended version for DVD and Blu-Ray and later split into two as two episodes on January 19, 2019 on CW Seed.

Tie-in comics

Reception
Key: 
Sales figures represent DVD and Blu-ray sales in the United States. International sales, digital sales, and rentals are not included.

See also
 DC Animated Universe
 DC Extended Universe
 Tomorrowverse

References

External links
 DC Movie titles at dccomics.com

 
Mass media franchises introduced in 2013
Continuity (fiction)
DC Comics franchises
DC Comics dimensions
DC Comics planets
Fictional universes
Mythopoeia
American animated films
English-language films
Anime-influenced Western animation